Kinder Lal also spelt as Kindar Lal was an Indian politician. He was elected as member of parliament to the Lok Sabha,  the lower house of the Parliament of India from Hardoi, Uttar Pradesh in 1962, 1967,1971 and 1984 as a member of the Indian National Congress.

References

External links
 Officia Biographical Sketch Member of Parliament Kinder Lal

1914 births
1991 deaths
India MPs 1962–1967
India MPs 1967–1970
India MPs 1971–1977
India MPs 1984–1989
Lok Sabha members from Uttar Pradesh
People from Hardoi district
Indian National Congress politicians from Uttar Pradesh